Kandie Diane Smith (born October 20, 1969) is a  Democratic member of the North Carolina House of Representatives. Smith has represented the 8th district (including constituents in Pitt County) since 2019. She was previously the interim mayor of Greenville, North Carolina.

Education and early life
Smith obtained a bachelor's degree from Charleston Southern University where she majored in sociology and minored in communications.

Greenville City Council
Before her election to mayor, Smith was on the Greenville City Council, representing District 1. When the former mayor, Allen Thomas, stepped down, Smith was elected mayor by the members of the council and held that office until the next election in November 2017, where she won re-election to the council, again serving District 1.

North Carolina House of Representatives
In 2016, Smith attempted to defeat the incumbent state representative Jean Farmer-Butterfield for the Democratic nomination for North Carolina's 24th House district. Farmer-Butterfield defeated Smith.

In December 2017, after the incumbent, Susan Martin, announced that she would not run for re-election, Smith announced she would run for the 8th House district. Smith defeated the Pitt County Board of Education chair, Mildred Council, and the retired U.S. Army captain, Ernest Reeves, receiving 50% of the vote.

Smith went on to face the businesswoman, Brenda Letchworth Smith. Smith defeated Letchworth Smith, with 64.6% against 35.4% percent. On January 1, Smith was formally sworn in.

Committee assignments

2021-2022 session
Agriculture 
Education - K-12 
Education - Universities 
Election Law and Campaign Finance Reform
Finance 
Health

2019-2020 session
Agriculture 
Education - K-12 
Education - Universities 
Election Law and Campaign Finance Reform
Finance
Health

Electoral history

2009

2011

2013

2015

2016

2017

2018

2020

2022

References

|-

Living people
1969 births
People from Spartanburg, South Carolina
People from Greenville, North Carolina
Charleston Southern University alumni
Democratic Party members of the North Carolina House of Representatives

21st-century American politicians
21st-century African-American politicians
21st-century American women politicians
Women state legislators in North Carolina